"Make Me Smile (Come Up and See Me)" is a song by the British rock band Steve Harley & Cockney Rebel, which was released in 1975 by EMI as the lead single from the band's third studio album The Best Years of Our Lives. The song was written by Harley, and produced by Harley and Alan Parsons. In February 1975, the song reached number one on the UK chart and received a gold certification from the British Phonographic Industry in October 2021. It spent nine weeks in the Top 50, and as of 2015, has sold over 1.5 million copies worldwide.

More than 120 cover versions of the song have been recorded by other artists, most notably by Duran Duran and Erasure, although Harley has stated his favourite cover version is by The Wedding Present.

Writing and composition
The song was the first single to be released under the name "Steve Harley and Cockney Rebel", as opposed to simply "Cockney Rebel". In July 1974, the original Cockney Rebel disbanded, and Harley then assembled a new line-up later in the year. "Make Me Smile" described Harley's feelings on the band's split. For many years, it was believed that Harley purposely chose to disband the original line-up and embark on a new career path. However, years later, Harley began to reveal the truth behind the band's split.

Between May and July 1974, Cockney Rebel embarked on a major British tour to promote their second studio album The Psychomodo. As the tour progressed, the band began facing growing tensions, which ultimately led to their split at the end of the tour in late July. On 18 July, the band received a 'Gold Award' for outstanding new act of 1974, and a week later they had split up over their disagreements. Jean-Paul Crocker, Milton Reame-James and Paul Jeffreys had approached Harley, insisting they could also write material for the group. Harley, the band's sole songwriter, felt this was unfair as he had been the one to originally hire the musicians for his group, and explained the deal to them at the time.

After the band split, only the original line-up's drummer, Stuart Elliott, would join the new line-up. In a television interview recorded in 2002, Harley described how the lyrics were vindictively directed at the former band members who, he felt, had abandoned him.

On The One Show in October 2010, Harley called the lyric "a finger-pointing piece of vengeful poetry. It's getting off my chest how I felt about the guys splitting up a perfectly workable machine. I wrote it saying 'Look, you'll learn how well we're doing here, we're doing well, why are you doing this?'" He elaborated:

Harley began writing the song only days after the band's split. The original vision for the song was vastly different from the one that was recorded. Harley had written the piece as a slow blues track with a dark mood. In January 2012, he told Uncut magazine that the first verse was probably written at four in the morning after a bottle of brandy, feeling sorry for himself. On The One Show Harley added, "I was in distress, there's no doubt at all, out of adversity I had to talk about it, I had to write about it. I had to say these things, I had to get it off my chest."

In One Thousand UK Number One Hits by Jon Kutner and Spencer Leigh, Harley recalled the end of Cockney Rebel version 1:

Recording
The new line-up of the band recorded The Best Years of Our Lives album in November–December 1974 at Abbey Road Studios in London. On a day in November, Harley arrived at the studio and played the band the original slow blues version of the song for them to rehearse. Harley recalled to Uncut in 2012: "It was a little dirgy, slower and a little pedestrian, very on the beat".

After producer Alan Parsons heard the song, he suggested speeding the song's tempo up, as he felt it would suit the song better. Harley then developed the song further, introducing tacets, dead stops and gaps into it. Harley recalled in 2014: "Alan was great, he didn't try to dissuade me, he just said, 'Do it'." On The One Show, Harley added: "Suddenly it was swinging, and bopping, and ooh-la-la. We saw a hit record being built here, there was no doubt."

In a 2015 interview for Songwriting Magazine, Parsons recalled:

A saxophone solo was originally planned for the song's instrumental break. However, after hearing Harley's idea for the solo, guitarist Jim Cregan began to play the idea on the guitar. Harley recalled in 2014:

A number of backing singers contributed to the song, including future chart-topper Tina Charles, as well as Yvonne Keeley, Linda Lewis and Liza Strike.

When the song was near completion, Harley played an early mix of the song to Bob Mercer, who was the head of A&R at EMI. Mercer was so blown away by what he heard that he immediately pronounced the song as a number-one hit. Harley remembered: "We were all drinking Martini, it was late at night, and we were completely knackered. Bob came in and was absolutely blown away. I asked him what he thought and he said simply, "Number one".

By the time the song was finished, Harley and the band felt confident the song was a hit single. He recalled: "We certainly smelled something cooking that was very special. We had a huge chorus on there. Once they'd [the backing vocalists] had done their bit I came up with The Beatles bit – 'Ooh-la-la-la' – kind of from their "Rubber Soul" period. I made the song really hooky because the lyrics are quite dark and cynical, frankly."

Release
The single was released by EMI Records on 7-inch vinyl in the UK, Ireland, Belgium, Denmark, France, Germany, Italy, the Netherlands, Portugal, Spain, Yugoslavia, Scandinavia, Australia, New Zealand, South Africa, and Japan. Each release, except in the UK, Ireland, Australia and New Zealand, featured a different picture sleeve, usually featuring a photograph of Harley, or the band. The single's B-side was the non-album track "Another Journey", which was written by Harley.

"Make Me Smile (Come Up and See Me)" became Steve Harley and Cockney Rebel's biggest selling hit, selling over one million copies globally. It was also the band's only number-one hit in their home country, topping both the UK Singles Chart and the Irish Singles Chart in February 1975. In addition to this, it was the band's only chart entry in America, reaching No. 96 on the Billboard Hot 100 chart in 1976.

"Make Me Smile" has been reissued a number of times in the UK. In October 1980, EMI re-issued it on 7-inch vinyl by EMI, with "Sebastian" as the B-side, to promote the compilation album The Best of Steve Harley and Cockney Rebel. In 1983, it was issued again on 7-inch vinyl, by the Old Gold label, with "Judy Teen" as the B-side. Both re-issues failed to chart. In 1992, the song was released by EMI as a CD single and 7-inch vinyl. The re-issue reached No. 46 in the UK, and remained in the Top 100 for two weeks. In 1995, the song was re-issued again on 7-inch vinyl and CD after it was used in a Carlsberg TV advertisement. This release reached No. 33 in the UK, spending three weeks in the chart. In June 2005, a newly recorded 2005 version of the track was released, dubbed as the "30th Anniversary Re-mix" of the song. The new version was released as a single on 7-inch vinyl and CD. The single reached No. 55, spending two weeks on the chart. Following a request on Top Gear to download the song, "Make Me Smile" re-entered the UK charts at No. 72 in early February 2015.

The song has been used in the soundtracks of the films Rik Mayall Presents Dancing Queen (1993),  The Full Monty (1997), Velvet Goldmine (1998), Best – The George Best Story (2000), Saving Grace (2000), and Blackball (2003). It was also used in a 2006 Marks & Spencer advertisement and during the opening of episode 3 of Phoenix Nights series 1 (2001). The song also featured in adverts for Furniture Village. The song was also featured in an advert for Viagra Connect drug for erectile dysfunction, first broadcast in the UK in May 2018.

The song was later included as a playable song in Lego Rock Band (2009) for the seventh generation of games consoles.

Top Gear
In late 2014, Harley received a speeding fine of £1,000, and six points on his licence, after being caught by a speed camera doing 70 miles per hour on the M25 in Kent, in an area where the limit had been temporarily reduced to 40 mph. In January 2015, this incident was discussed on the BBC television series Top Gear. The show's presenters Jeremy Clarkson, Richard Hammond and James May urged viewers to download the song in a bid to help him pay the fine. Clarkson had commented, "He's making a meagre living out of, let's be honest, one hit single. Everybody loves that song – you can't trust someone who doesn't like that song." Hammond added, "Imagine if everybody did it – he would wake up tomorrow and think 'I'm number one, where did that come from?' It would cheer him up."

The campaign, dubbed the "Make Me Smile Foundation" by Clarkson, saw Harley respond with a message via Twitter: "Thanks Jeremy Clarkson for kicking off the Make Me Smile Foundation, more than happy to subsidise the poor sods who drive down Swanley Way!" Additionally, Harley posted a YouTube video where he performed a forty-second version of the song acoustically, with a new set of lyrics relating to the speeding fine.

In late January 2015, the song entered the Top 30 on iTunes, the Top 15 on Amazon.co.uk's Top 100 Bestsellers, and the number one best-seller under the Rock category on the same website. On 27 January, the song entered at No. 25 on the official UK mid-week chart, and No. 72 on the overall chart for the week.

Promotion
Upon its original release, the band performed the song on UK music show Top of the Pops. The performance on the show featured mimed instrumental backing, with Harley performing a live vocal. On the show, Harley was suffering from jet-lag, and subsequently forgot the lyrics to the majority of the second and third verses. According to the EMI producer of the single, Tony Clark, it was Marc Bolan who made the phone call to Top of the Pops, and had Harley in the BBC studio that same evening of the recording. The band also performed the song on the Russell Harty Show while it was at number one.

Critical reception
On its release, Sue Byrom of Record & Popswop Mirror felt the song lacked the "punch" and "innovative flash" of the original Cockney Rebel, but predicted it would be a hit. John Peel, writing for Sounds, rated it three out of five stars and predicted it would reach the top 10. He considered it to show a "softer Harley" as he "put[s] his stylised voice to work on an attractive pop song" with the "soft accompaniment [of] acoustic guitar, classical guitar and singing ladies". The Irvine Herald felt the song "knocks spots off their old material" and added that the guitar solo is "a delight to listen to". In a retrospective review of The Best Years of Our Lives, Donald A. Guarisco of AllMusic described the song as a "romantic pop tune" which "pairs Harley's clever wordplay with a clever pop tune that boasts an inventive stop-start arrangement and a lovely flamenco-styled acoustic guitar solo".

Track listing
7-inch single
"Make Me Smile (Come Up and See Me)" – 3:55
"Another Journey" – 2:47

7-inch single (1982 UK reissue)
"Make Me Smile (Come Up and See Me)" – 3:55
"Sebastian"

7-inch single (1983 UK reissue)
"Make Me Smile (Come Up and See Me)" – 3:58
"Judy Teen" – 3:41

7-inch single (1992 UK reissue)
"Make Me Smile (Come Up and See Me)" – 3:59
"Mr. Soft" – 3:19

CD single (1992 UK reissue)
"Make Me Smile (Come Up and See Me)" – 3:59
"Mr. Soft" – 3:19
"Spaced Out" – 3:02
"(Love) Compared with You" – 4:19

7-inch single (1995 UK reissue)
"Make Me Smile (Come Up and See Me)" – 3:59
"Mr. Soft" – 3:17

CD single (1995 UK reissue)
"Make Me Smile (Come Up and See Me)" – 3:59
"Mr. Soft" – 3:17
"(I Believe) Love's a Prima Donna" – 4:07
"Another Journey" – 2:48

7-inch single (2005 UK 30th Anniversary Re-mix)
"Make Me Smile (Come Up And See Me) 30th Anniversary Re-mix" – 4:29
"Judy Teen" (Live) – 3:16

CD single (2005 UK 30th Anniversary Re-mix)
"Make Me Smile (Come Up And See Me) 30th Anniversary Re-mix" – 4:29
"Judy Teen" (Live) – 3:16
"The Quality of Mercy (Taster)" – 1:58

Personnel

Steve Harley and Cockney Rebel:
 Steve Harley – vocals
 Jim Cregan – guitar, backing vocals
 Duncan Mackay – keyboards
 George Ford – bass guitar, backing vocals
 Stuart Elliott – drums

Additional personnel
 Tina Charles, Martin Jay, Yvonne Keeley, Linda Lewis, Liza Strike – backing vocals
 Steve Harley, Alan Parsons – producers
 Alan Parsons – mixing, engineer
 Gary Edwards, Peter James – tape operators
 Chris Blair – mastering

Charts

Weekly charts

Year-end charts

Certifications

Duran Duran version

A live cover version of "Make Me Smile" was released as the B-side to Duran Duran's 1984 number one single "The Reflex".  On the label and sleeve, the song's original title was reversed and listed as "Come Up and See Me (Make Me Smile)".  The band frequently covered the song during their early  concerts, and this recording was made during a  live performance for the BBC College Concert series. The entire concert was released on the live CD/DVD Live at Hammersmith '82! in September 2009.

After dropping the song from their set list for over twenty years, the reunited Duran Duran brought the song back as a surprise encore at their 28 May 2005 homecoming gig at the Birmingham Football Ground to an audience of 25,000 fans. Harley was invited to perform with them, but was unable to attend.

The Duran Duran version of the song appeared on the soundtrack to the movie Threesome (1994), and as a bonus track on the double CD single for "Perfect Day", from their 1995 covers album Thank You.

Track Listing

 7-inch single (UK: EMI / DURAN2)

The Wedding Present version

A version by The Wedding Present peaked in the UK Singles Chart at number 25 in 1990, as a track on the 3 Songs EP. Steve Harley was very positive about this version, saying, "There are 120 cover versions of 'Make Me Smile', but only the Wedding Present have done it differently. They did a punk version and made it kick. They understood the venom in the lyrics." The cover is also included in the 2001 version of the album Seamonsters and the Compilation The Pop Years - 1990-1991.

Track listings 
7-inch EP
 Corduroy		
 Crawl		
 Make Me Smile (Come Up And See Me)

Erasure version

The British pop duo Erasure included "Make Me Smile (Come Up and See Me)" on their cover versions album Other People's Songs. After the UK top-ten success of their previous single "Solsbury Hill", Erasure again charted well when "Make Me Smile" reached number 14 on the UK Singles Chart. It also reached number 19 in Denmark and number 58 in Germany.

Erasure's version appeared in the first episode of season one of the television show My Name Is Earl in 2005.

Music video
The music video has Erasure members Vince Clarke and Andy Bell in the midst of computer-generated special effects and graphics. The statue in the video also appears in their 2005 video for "Breathe".

Track listings
CD single
 UK: Mute / CDMUTE292

 UK: Mute / LCDMUTE292

DVD single
 UK: Mute / DVDMUTE292

Charts

Other cover versions
Australian group Nick Barker & the Reptiles' version reached the top 30 on the Australian Recording Industry Association (ARIA) Singles Chart in November 1989.

References

Bibliography

External links
 Top of the Pops performance by Steve Harley & Cockney Rebel

1975 songs
1975 singles
1984 singles
1990 singles
1995 singles
2003 singles
2005 singles
Erasure songs
Song recordings produced by Gareth Jones
Duran Duran songs
Irish Singles Chart number-one singles
UK Singles Chart number-one singles
UK Independent Singles Chart number-one singles
Mute Records singles
Songs written by Steve Harley